Gianni Del Buono (1 October 1943) is a former Italian middle distance runner.

He is the husband of the Italian middle-distance runner Rossella Gramola and the father of the middle-distance runner Federica Del Buono.

Biography
Gianni Del Buono won three medals, at senior level, at the International athletics competitions. He participated at two editions of the Summer Olympics (1968 and 1972), he has 31 caps in national team from 1963 to 1973.

Olympic results

National titles
Gianni Del Buono has won 7 times the individual national championship.
1 win in the 800 metres (1970)
2 wins in the 1500 metres (1969, 1973)
1 win in the cross country running (1971)
1 win in the 1500 metres indoor (1971)
2 wins in the 3000 metres indoor (1972, 1973)

See also
 Italian all-time lists - 800 metres
 800 metres winners of Italian Athletics Championships

References

External links
 

1943 births
Italian male cross country runners
Italian male middle-distance runners
Athletes (track and field) at the 1968 Summer Olympics
Athletes (track and field) at the 1972 Summer Olympics
Olympic athletes of Italy
Universiade medalists in athletics (track and field)
Living people
Universiade bronze medalists for Italy
Medalists at the 1970 Summer Universiade